Oberwolfach is a town in the district of Ortenau in Baden-Württemberg, Germany. It is the site of the Oberwolfach Research Institute for Mathematics, or Mathematisches Forschungsinstitut Oberwolfach.

Geography

Geographical situation 
The town of Oberwolfach lies between 270 and 948 meters above sea level in the central Schwarzwald (Black Forest) on the river Wolf, a tributary of the Kinzig.

Neighbouring localities 
The district is neighboured by Bad Peterstal-Griesbach to the north, Bad Rippoldsau-Schapbach in Landkreis Freudenstadt to the east, by the towns of Wolfach and Hausach to the south, and by Oberharmersbach to the west.

References

External links 
Gemeinde Oberwolfach: Official Homepage (in German)
Oberwolfach Mineral Museum

Ortenaukreis